Following Sean is a 2005 documentary film directed by Ralph Arlyck, and a follow-up to his 1969 student short Sean, which features four-year-old Sean's thoughts on marijuana (including his own use), police presence, and freewheeling lifestyles. The film's notoriety landed a screening in the White House and a variety of predictions regarding the outcome of Sean's life - whether he could grow up to embody the hippy philosophy, or whether he would turn out a drug dealer or stock broker.

Following Sean picks up in the mid-1990s and turns Sean's story into a meditation on generational changes and legacies that are handed down as a result of choices made in heated political climates. The film was met with high critical praise, receiving an 86% "Fresh" rating on Rotten Tomatoes and a 64 on Metacritic.

References

External links
 Official Site
 Following Sean on IMDb
 Following Sean on Rotten Tomatoes
 Following Sean on Metacritic
 P.O.V. Following Sean  - PBS's site dedicated to the film

2005 films
2005 documentary films
Documentary films about San Francisco
POV (TV series) films
2000s English-language films
2000s American films